Ève Bazaiba Masudi (née Ève Bazaiba) (born 12 August 1965) is a Congolese lawyer, politician, and human rights activist. As of May 2019, she served as the Secretary General of the Movement for the Liberation of the Congo (MLC) political party. She is Deputy Prime Minister and Minister for the Environment since 2021.

Early life and education
Ève Bazaiba was born on 12 August 1965 in Stanleyville (today Kisangani), in the Democratic Republic of the Congo. She studied Latin and Philosophy at Bosangani High School (Lycée Bosangani), in Kinshasa before being admitted to Cardinal Malula University, also in Kinshasa, and graduating with a Bachelor of International Relations degree. In 2010 Bazaiba earned a law degree from the Protestant University in the Congo.

Career
In 1988, Bazaiba became an activist for the Union for Democracy and Social Progress (UDPS) political party, led by Étienne Tshisekedi. She was arrested several times under the regime of Mobutu Sese Seko, imprisoned for four days under the regime of Laurent-Desire Kabila and sued by the government of Joseph Kabila for denouncing corruption in the mining industry. In 2002, she participated in the Sun City talks that set up the transitional government that led to the 2006 elections of the Third Republic. When her party, the UDPS boycotted the elections, she personally pleaded with Étienne Tshisekedi and other party leadership to obtain a waiver to contest.

In 2007, she was elected to the Senate as a member of the Movement for the Liberation of the Congo (MLC) political party, by the Kinshasa Provincial Assembly. After serving her five-year term, she became president (chairperson) of the socio-cultural commission at the National Assembly in the Democratic Republic of Congo. She is a strong advocate for human rights and particularly the rights of women and other vulnerable groups. During the 2011–2016 legislative session she proposed a bill that provided for special protections for disabled persons. She re-introduced the bill in 2019.

As of 2019, she served as the Secretary General of the MLC.

Family
Baizaba is a married mother.

Other responsibilities
Eva Baizaba is the president of the League of Congolese Women for Elections (LIFCE).

See also
 Félix Tshisekedi
 Jean-Pierre Bemba
 Acacia Bandubola Mbongo

References

Works cited

External links
  Gender Inequality And Social Institutions In The Democratic Republic Of The Congo As of December 2010.

21st-century Democratic Republic of the Congo women politicians
21st-century Democratic Republic of the Congo politicians
Members of the Senate (Democratic Republic of the Congo)
People from Kisangani
1965 births
Living people
Protestant University in the Congo alumni